Teta is a 2016 American short documentary film written, directed, and produced by Alexandra Hidalgo. The film premiered as part of a Cultural Rhetorics conference at Michigan State University in 2016. It also screened at the Capital City Film Festival, Boston Latino International Film Festival, and Cine Pobre Film Festival.

Plot 
A working mother (Alexandra Hidalgo) tells the story of nursing her youngest son, Santiago, for twenty-two months.

Awards  
 Won - Best Documentary Film Award at the 10th Jaipur International Film Festival, 2018
 Won - Honorable mention award at the United Latino Film Festival, 2017
 Won - Best documentary short film at Five Continents International Film Festival, 2017

References

External links 
 
 

2016 films
American short documentary films
2010s English-language films
2010s American films
2016 short documentary films